Thene Manasulu is a 1965 Indian Telugu-language romance film directed by Adurthi Subba Rao and written by Mullapudi Venkata Ramana. The film stars Krishna, Ram Mohan, Sandhya Rani and Sukanya. It revolves a young girl (Sukanya) falls in love with a man (Krishna), not realising he is the same man her was marriage was initially fixed with. Thene Manasulu is based on K. R. K. Mohan's novel Vakrinchina Sarala Rekhalu. It was the first major role given to actor Krishna Ghattamaneni and also the acting debut for Rammohan, Sandhya Rani and Sukanya. The film was produced by C. Sundaram under Babu Movies, photographed by P. S. Selvaraj, and edited by T. Krishna. It was the first Telugu social film to be shot completely in colour. Thene Manasulu was released on 31 March 1965 and became a commercial success. It was remade in Hindi as Doli (1969).

Plot 
Sita and Bhanumathi are friends. Chittibabu and Basavaraju are classmates. Chittibabu agrees to marry Sita on the condition that her father Narasaraju send him to the United States for higher studies. To pay for his daughter's wedding, Narasaraju steals money from the office of Bhanumathi's father Srinivasa Rao. Fearing he will be accused of embezzling money, Srinivasa Rao abandons his family and runs away. Basavaraju rejects his bride Bhanumathi without even looking at her. Bhanumathi leaves for the city along with her mother and obtains employment in a firm. Basavaraju meets and falls in love with Bhanumathi, unaware that she is the same woman he rejected earlier. Chittibabu, upon returning from the United States, neglects his wife Sita and falls in love with Bhanumathi. To fix things for Sita, Bhanumathi initiates an elaborate plan and successfully unites her with Chittibabu, while Bhanumathi marries Basavaraju.

Cast

Production

Development 
In the mid-1960s, director Adurthi Subba Rao wanted to make a film with newcomers as the stars. It was decided to adapt K. R. K. Mohan's novel Vakrinchina Sarala Rekhalu with the title Thene Manasulu. The film was produced by C. Sundaram under Babu Movies, Mullapudi Venkata Ramana was hired as the screenwriter and K. Viswanath as associate director. Viswanath also worked as the dialogue writer alongside Aatreya. Cinematography was handled by P. S. Selvaraj, and editing by T. Krishna.

Casting 
Babu Movies released an advertisement saying the film required newcomers in the lead, and thousands of aspiring actors auditioned. Hema Malini and J. Jayalalithaa, not yet the stars of Bollywood and Tamil cinema they would later become, were among those who auditioned, but both were rejected. Krishnam Raju too was an unsuccessful contender. The leading roles finally went to Krishna, Rammohan, Sandhya Rani and Sukanya. This was Krishna's first film in a major role, after he appeared as an extra in the 1962 releases Padandi Munduku and Kula Gotralu.

Filming 
Principal photography began at Saradhi Studios. The film was initially planned to be in black and white, but after seven to eight reels were shot, Adurthi decided to reshoot the entire film in Eastmancolor. Thene Manasulu thus became the first Telugu social film to be shot completely in colour. A few scenes required Krishna to ride a scooter, so actor Raavi Kondala Rao, at Adurthi’s request, taught Krishna to drive the scooter in the streets leading from Saradhi Studios to Sanathnagar. It took four days for Krishna to learn scooter driving.

Soundtrack 
The soundtrack was composed by K. V. Mahadevan, while the lyrics were written by Aatreya and Dasaradhi.

Release and reception 
Thene Manasulu was released on 31 March 1965.  The film became a commercial success, running for over 100 days in theatres. Despite its success, among the four leads only Krishna attained stardom. Adurthi remade the film in Hindi as Doli (1969) which was also successful.

Notes

References

Bibliography

External links 

1960s romance films
1960s Telugu-language films
1965 films
Films based on Indian novels
Films directed by Adurthi Subba Rao
Films scored by K. V. Mahadevan
Indian romance films
Telugu films remade in other languages